Feliks Kark (born 13 December 1933 in Tallinn) is an Estonian actor and caricaturist.

From 1965 to 1986, he worked at Rakvere Theatre. Since 1986 he is working at Endla Theatre. He has also played in several films.

In 2015, he was awarded with Order of the White Star, IV class. His younger brother is actor Tõnu Kark.

References

Living people
1933 births
Estonian male stage actors
Estonian male film actors
Estonian male television actors
Estonian caricaturists
Recipients of the Order of the White Star, 4th Class
People from Tallinn